The PHILIPS 1995 China FA Cup (Chinese: 1995飞利浦中国足球协会杯) was the inaugural edition of Chinese FA Cup after professional football league was established in China. The cup title sponsor was Philips.

Results

First round

First leg

Second leg

Second round

First leg

Second leg

Semi-finals

First leg

Second leg

Final

References

1995
1995 in Chinese football
1995 domestic association football cups